The 1929–30 New York Rangers season was the franchise's fourth season. In the regular season, the Rangers finished third in the American Division with a 17–17–10 record. New York qualified for the Stanley Cup playoffs, where the Rangers defeated the Ottawa Senators 6–3 in a two-game, total-goals series, but lost to the Montreal Canadiens 2–0 in the semi-finals.

Regular season

Final standings

Record vs. opponents

Schedule and results

|- align="center" bgcolor="#CCFFCC"
| 1 || 14 || @ Montreal Maroons || 2–1 || 1–0–0
|- align="center" bgcolor="white"
| 2 || 17 || Detroit Cougars || 5 – 5 OT || 1–0–1
|- align="center" bgcolor="#FFBBBB"
| 3 || 19 || @ Boston Bruins || 3–2 || 1–1–1
|- align="center" bgcolor="#CCFFCC"
| 4 || 21 || Montreal Maroons || 2–1 || 2–1–1
|- align="center" bgcolor="#CCFFCC"
| 5 || 23 || @ Pittsburgh Pirates || 5–3 || 3–1–1
|- align="center" bgcolor="#FFBBBB"
| 6 || 26 || Toronto Maple Leafs || 4–3 || 3–2–1
|- align="center" bgcolor="#CCFFCC"
| 7 || 28 || @ Chicago Black Hawks || 3–2 || 4–2–1
|-

|- align="center" bgcolor="#FFBBBB"
| 8 || 1 || @ Detroit Cougars || 4–3 || 4–3–1
|- align="center" bgcolor="#CCFFCC"
| 9 || 8 || Pittsburgh Pirates || 5–1 || 5–3–1
|- align="center" bgcolor="#CCFFCC"
| 10 || 12 || Montreal Canadiens || 8–3 || 6–3–1
|- align="center" bgcolor="#FFBBBB"
| 11 || 14 || @ Toronto Maple Leafs || 7 – 6 OT || 6–4–1
|- align="center" bgcolor="#CCFFCC"
| 12 || 17 || New York Americans || 6–2 || 7–4–1
|- align="center" bgcolor="#FFBBBB"
| 13 || 19 || @ Montreal Canadiens || 7–2 || 7–5–1
|- align="center" bgcolor="#CCFFCC"
| 14 || 22 || Chicago Black Hawks || 3–1 || 8–5–1
|- align="center" bgcolor="#FFBBBB"
| 15 || 26 || Boston Bruins || 4–2 || 8–6–1
|- align="center" bgcolor="#CCFFCC"
| 16 || 28 || @ Ottawa Senators || 3–1 || 9–6–1
|- align="center" bgcolor="white"
| 17 || 31 || Ottawa Senators || 1 – 1 OT || 9–6–2
|-

|- align="center" bgcolor="#FFBBBB"
| 18 || 2 || @ New York Americans || 7–1 || 9–7–2
|- align="center" bgcolor="#CCFFCC"
| 19 || 5 || Pittsburgh Pirates || 8–3 || 10–7–2
|- align="center" bgcolor="#FFBBBB"
| 20 || 7 || @ Boston Bruins || 3–0 || 10–8–2
|- align="center" bgcolor="#FFBBBB"
| 21 || 9 || Montreal Maroons || 5–4 || 10–9–2
|- align="center" bgcolor="#FFBBBB"
| 22 || 12 || @ Chicago Black Hawks || 2–1 || 10–10–2
|- align="center" bgcolor="#CCFFCC"
| 23 || 14 || Detroit Cougars || 3–0 || 11–10–2
|- align="center" bgcolor="#CCFFCC"
| 24 || 18 || @ Pittsburgh Pirates || 6–5 || 12–10–2
|- align="center" bgcolor="#CCFFCC"
| 25 || 19 || Chicago Black Hawks || 4–1 || 13–10–2
|- align="center" bgcolor="#CCFFCC"
| 26 || 23 || Ottawa Senators || 6–3 || 14–10–2
|- align="center" bgcolor="#FFBBBB"
| 27 || 26 || @ Detroit Cougars || 7–3 || 14–11–2
|- align="center" bgcolor="#CCFFCC"
| 28 || 28 || New York Americans || 4 – 3 OT || 15–11–2
|-

|- align="center" bgcolor="white"
| 29 || 2 || Boston Bruins || 3 – 3 OT || 15–11–3
|- align="center" bgcolor="#FFBBBB"
| 30 || 4 || @ New York Americans || 5–3 || 15–12–3
|- align="center" bgcolor="white"
| 31 || 6 || Detroit Cougars || 1 – 1 OT || 15–12–4
|- align="center" bgcolor="white"
| 32 || 8 || @ Ottawa Senators || 2 – 2 OT || 15–12–5
|- align="center" bgcolor="#FFBBBB"
| 33 || 11 || @ Montreal Maroons || 5–2 || 15–13–5
|- align="center" bgcolor="#CCFFCC"
| 34 || 13 || Pittsburgh Pirates || 4–1 || 16–13–5
|- align="center" bgcolor="#FFBBBB"
| 35 || 18 || Toronto Maple Leafs || 5–1 || 16–14–5
|- align="center" bgcolor="#FFBBBB"
| 36 || 23 || Boston Bruins || 3–2 || 16–15–5
|- align="center" bgcolor="white"
| 37 || 27 || Chicago Black Hawks || 1 – 1 OT || 16–15–6
|-

|- align="center" bgcolor="white"
| 38 || 1 || @ Toronto Maple Leafs || 3 – 3 OT || 16–15–7
|- align="center" bgcolor="white"
| 39 || 2 || @ Detroit Cougars || 2 – 2 OT || 16–15–8
|- align="center" bgcolor="white"
| 40 || 4 || @ Chicago Black Hawks || 2 – 2 OT || 16–15–9
|- align="center" bgcolor="#FFBBBB"
| 41 || 8 || @ Montreal Canadiens || 6–0 || 16–16–9
|- align="center" bgcolor="white"
| 42 || 11 || Montreal Canadiens || 3 – 3 OT || 16–16–10
|- align="center" bgcolor="#CCFFCC"
| 43 || 15 || @ Pittsburgh Pirates || 4 – 3 OT || 17–16–10
|- align="center" bgcolor="#FFBBBB"
| 44 || 18 || @ Boston Bruins || 9–2 || 17–17–10
|-

Playoffs

Key:  Win  Loss

Player statistics
Skaters

Goaltenders

Goaltenders

†Denotes player spent time with another team before joining Rangers. Stats reflect time with Rangers only.
‡Traded mid-season. Stats reflect time with Rangers only.

See also
1929–30 NHL season

References

1929–30 New York Rangers Statistics
New York Rangers 1929–1930 Season

New York Rangers seasons
New York Rangers
New York Rangers
New York Rangers
New York Rangers
1920s in Manhattan
1930s in Manhattan
Madison Square Garden